The Monrovia Stakes is a Grade II American Thoroughbred horse race for fillies and mares, three years old and older over a distance of about  furlongs on the downhill turf course scheduled annually in April at Santa Anita Park in Arcadia, California.

History 
The event was inaugurated in 1968 as the Monrovia Handicap.

When conditions are too wet the Los Angeles Turf Club on discretion has moved the event to the dirt track. This has happened on several occasions including 1969, 1970, 1976, 1978, 1980, 1989, 1997, 2000, 2004, 2005 and 2019.

The event was run in two divisions in 1979.

The event was originally scheduled in February but the Los Angeles Turf Club in late 1999 moved the race to the start of the winter racing meet at Santa Anita whereby the race was run twice in the calendar year. The conditions of the race were modified so that three year old fillies could also enter the event. In 1999 and 2004 three year old fillies were victorious in the event.

In 2006 the club reverted to later in the 2006–2007 winter meet and consequently the event was not held in 2006. In 2007 the conditions were reverted so that only four year olds and older fillies and mares could enter.  In 2017 the event was moved from January to May and the event once again allowed three year old fillies to enter.

The race is named after Monrovia, the local city near the track at Arcadia.

The race was renamed to the current name in 2011.

In 2019, the distance was shortened by over a furlong to five furlongs, and held on the dirt track due to the weather. In 2020 the event was extended to  furlongs and the following year was held at  furlongs.

Records

Winners

Legend:

 
 

Notes:

¶ Not held due to change of scheduling during the winter meet

† Viva La Vivi won the race but was disqualified and placed last for interference

See also
List of American and Canadian Graded races

External sites
Santa Anita Media Guide for 2019 Winter Meet

References

Horse races in California
Santa Anita Park
Graded stakes races in the United States
Turf races in the United States
Sprint category horse races for fillies and mares
Recurring sporting events established in 1968
1968 establishments in California
Grade 2 stakes races in the United States